Recapitalization is a type of corporate reorganization involving substantial change in a company's capital structure. Recapitalization may be motivated by a number of reasons. Usually, the large part of equity is replaced with debt or vice versa. In more complicated transactions, mezzanine financing and other hybrid securities are involved.

Leveraged recapitalization
One example of recapitalization is a leveraged recapitalization in which the company issues bonds to raise money and then buys back its own shares. Usually, current shareholders retain control. The reasons for such a recapitalization include:
 Desire of current shareholders to partially exit the investment
 Providing support of falling share price
 Disciplining the company that has excessive cash
 Protection from a hostile takeover
 Rebalancing positions within a holding company
 Help to improve the stock of the company during a time of poor economic conditions

Leveraged buyout
Another example is a leveraged buyout, essentially a leveraged recapitalization initiated by an outside party. Usually, incumbent equityholders cede control. The reasons for this transaction may include:
 Getting control over the company via a friendly or hostile takeover
 Disciplining the company with excessive cash
 Creating shareholder value via gradual debt repayment

Nationalization
Another example is a nationalization in which the nation in which the company is headquartered buys sufficient shares of the company to obtain a controlling interest. Usually, incumbent equity-holders lose control. The reasons for nationalization may include:
 Saving a very valuable company from bankruptcy 
 Confiscation of assets
 Executing eminent domain

Nationalisation 
Is essentially a move by the nation of the company to acquire controlling interest in the company, either through buying majority shares with a motive to:

1) eliminate dominance of the shareholders.

2) Own controlling interest in the company
 
It can also be an attempt by the national government to rehabilitate its position financially by issuing bonds to increase public debt and meet immediate liabilities.

References

Financial capital